Blabia meinerti is a species of beetle in the family Cerambycidae. It was described by Per Olof Christopher Aurivillius in 1900. It is known from Colombia and Venezuela.

References

Blabia
Beetles described in 1900